Prakovce is a village and municipality in the Gelnica District in the Košice Region of eastern Slovakia. Total municipality population was in 2011 3397 inhabitants

References

External links
http://en.e-obce.sk/obec/prakovce/prakovce.html
Official homepage

Villages and municipalities in Gelnica District